Not the End of the World is a 2004 young adult novel by Geraldine McCaughrean. It retells the Biblical story of Noah's Ark. The main character is Noah's thirteen-year-old daughter, Timna. The story is also relayed from the points of view of the animals. The novel was first published in 2004 and was the winner of the 2004 Whitbread Children's Book Award.

References

2004 British novels
British young adult novels
Costa Book Award-winning works
Novels about Noah's Ark
Novels based on the Bible
Oxford University Press books
Children's novels about animals